West Newton is the name of various locations:

in England

West Newton, East Riding of Yorkshire
West Newton, Norfolk
West Newton, Somerset

in the United States
West Newton, Indiana
West Newton, Massachusetts
West Newton (MBTA station)
West Newton, Minnesota, ghost town
West Newton, Wabasha County, Minnesota, unincorporated community
West Newton, Ohio
West Newton, Pennsylvania
West Newton Township, Nicollet County, Minnesota

See also

Westnewton (disambiguation)